Baroiyadhala National Park is IUCN Category II national park and nature reserve in Bangladesh. The park is located at Sitakunda Upazila, Chattogram District in the east site of the Dhaka-Chittagong Highway. It provides important wildlife corridors for disappearing flora and fauna of Bangladesh. Khoiyachora Waterfall is located inside the Baroiyadhala National Park.

The park was officially declared as a national park by the government of Bangladesh on 6 April 2010. It covers an area of 2933.61 hectares.

References

National parks of Bangladesh
Chittagong District
Protected areas established in 2010
2010 establishments in Bangladesh
Forests of Bangladesh